Kieran Murphy may refer to:

 Kieran Murphy (rugby union) (born 1988), Welsh rugby union player
 Kieran Murphy (Sarsfields hurler) (born 1983), Irish hurler for Sarsfields and Cork
 Kieran Murphy (Erin's Own hurler), Irish hurler for Erin's Own and Cork
 Kieran Murphy (footballer) (born 1987), Irish footballer
 Kieran Murphy (cyclist), Australian Paralympic tandem cyclist
 Kieran Murphy (Gaelic footballer) (born 1955), Irish Gaelic footballer

See also
 Ciarán Murphy